Songs from the Gutter is the fourth album by the English singer-songwriter Thea Gilmore. It was released in 2002 on her own Shameless label in association with  Flying Sparks and Hot Records. The album included a bonus disc of material previously only available over the internet.

Track listing
All songs written by Thea Gilmore, except where noted.
"Down To Nowhere" – 3:53
"When Did You Get So Safe?" – 3:24
"Tear It All Down" (The Gilmore/Nigel Stonier) – 4:06
"The Dirt Is Your Lover Now" – 4:30
"I Dreamed I Saw St Augustine" (Bob Dylan) – 4:43
"Lip Reading" – 3:34
"Heart String Blues" – 4:22
"Mud On My Shoes" – 3:29
"Water To Sky" – 2:41
"And We'll Dance" – 4:01

Bonus disc
"Cover Me" (Bruce Springsteen) – 3:37
"I'm Not Down" (Strummer/Jones/Simonon/Headon) – 2:59
"Hydrogen" (1996) – 3:32
"Beelzebub" (1996) – 4:07
"Maybe" (1996) – 3:56
"Red Farm" (1997) – 3:56
"Brittle Dreams" (1996) – 3:47
"December In New York" (1997) – 3:38
"Gun Cotton" (1999) – 4:14
"Don't Set Foot Over The Railway Track" (2000) – 2:27
"Lavender Cowgirl" (2000) – 2:57
"You Tell Me" (2001) – 3:37
"Straight Lines" (2001) – 5:33

Reception

Allmusic'''s Rick Anderson gave the album four stars, calling it "essential". Billboard'' called her vision on the album "dark, cold, yet rapturous".

Personnel
Thea Gilmore - vocals
Nigel Stonier - guitar, keyboards
Paul Beavis - drums
Robbie McIntosh - guitar

References

2002 albums
Thea Gilmore albums